Battyeford is a village in West Yorkshire, England west of the town of Mirfield.

History
From 1900 to 1953 the village was served by Battyeford railway station on the Leeds New Line.

Governance
The village is part of the civil parish of Mirfield, and part of the Mirfield ward of the metropolitan borough of Kirklees. The borough council is a metropolitan borough of West Yorkshire.

Religious sites
Christ the King in Battyeford is an Anglican church and part of the Diocese of Wakefield. It was built in 1973 on the site of the original Christ Church which was built in 1841 and destroyed by fire in 1971.

References

Villages in West Yorkshire